The Angeles de Puebla, or Angeles Negros de Puebla ("Angels of Puebla" or "Black Angels of Puebla"), was a baseball club which were very successful in their short time in the Mexican League. The Pericos de Puebla had left the Liga in 1969, and when a new team took their place in 1972, they used a new name.

After winning a division title in 1975, the team finished with the best record in the league in both 1976 and 1977, but made a first-round exit from the playoffs all three years. In 1979 they won the Liga pennant and in 1980 had the best record in the league when it was shut down by a strike in mid-season. The Angeles were one of the teams that did not take part in the restarted season, and did not return to the league in 1981.

In 1985, the Angeles returned to the Mexican League, but after what the owner considered a bad season, he renamed the team as the Angeles Negros ("Black Angels"). Following the name change, the team hit .347 and scored over seven runs a game in the offensive explosion of 1986 in Mexico. Willie Aikens put up one of the most memorable seasons in League annals and the Angeles won their second title. The Angeles left town after just one more season, as another championship failed to translate into long-term roots. 

The team became the Charros de Jalisco in 1988. The Pericos de Puebla returned to the Mexican League in 1993, but a weak team lasted only three seasons before disappearing again. The Pericos returned to Puebla once again in 2000.

Year-by-year record

References

Baseball teams established in 1972
Defunct baseball teams in Mexico
Sports clubs disestablished in 1995
Defunct Mexican League teams